The PB2Y Coronado is a large flying boat patrol bomber designed by Consolidated Aircraft, and used by the US Navy during World War II in bombing, antisubmarine, and transport roles. Obsolete by the end of the war, Coronados were quickly taken out of service. Only one known example remains, at the National Naval Aviation Museum at Naval Air Station Pensacola, Florida.

Design and development
After deliveries of the PBY Catalina, also a Consolidated aircraft, began in 1935, the United States Navy began planning for the next generation of patrol bombers. Orders for two prototypes, the XPB2Y-1 and the Sikorsky XPBS-1, were placed in 1936; the prototype Coronado first flew in December 1937.

After trials with the XPB2Y-1 prototype revealed some stability issues, the design was finalized as the PB2Y-2, with a large cantilever wing, twin tail with very marked dihedral, and four Pratt & Whitney R-1830 radial engines. The two inner engines were fitted with four-bladed reversible pitch propellers; the outer engines had standard three-bladed feathering props. Like the PBY Catalina before it, the PB2Y's wingtip floats retracted to reduce drag and increase range, with the floats' buoyant hulls acting as the wingtips when retracted. The price of the PB2Y-2 was US$300,000, or approximately three times that of the PBY Catalina.

Development continued throughout the war. The PB2Y-3, featuring self-sealing fuel tanks and additional armor, entered service just after the attack on Pearl Harbor and formed most of the early-war Coronado fleet. The prototype XPB2Y-4 was powered by four Wright R-2600 radials and offered improved performance, but the increases were not enough to justify a full fleet update. However, most PB2Y-3 models were converted to the PB2Y-5 standard, with the R-1830 engines replaced with single-stage R-1830-92 models. As most existing PB2Y-3s were used as transports, flying low to avoid combat, removing the excess weight of unneeded superchargers allowed an increased payload without harming low-altitude performance.

Operational history

Coronados served in combat in the Pacific with the United States Navy, in both bombing and antisubmarine roles. PB2Y-5 Coronados carried out four bombing raids on Wake Island between
30 January and 9 February 1944. However, most served as transport and hospital aircraft.

The British Royal Air Force Coastal Command had hoped to use the Coronado as a maritime patrol bomber, as it already used the PBY Catalina. However, the range of the Coronado (1,070 miles) compared poorly with the Catalina (2,520 mi), and the Short Sunderland (1,780 mi). Consequently, the Coronados supplied to the RAF under Lend-Lease were outfitted purely as transports, serving with RAF Transport Command. The 10 aircraft were used for transatlantic flights, staging through the RAF base at Darrell's Island, Bermuda, and Puerto Rico, though the aircraft were used to deliver vital cargo and equipment in a transportation network that stretched down both sides of the Atlantic, from Newfoundland, to Brazil, and to Nigeria, and other parts of Africa. After the war ended five of the RAF aircraft were scrapped, one was already lost in collision with a Martin PBM Mariner and the last four were scuttled off the coast of Bermuda in 1946.

Coronados served as a major component in the Naval Air Transport Service (NATS) during World War II in the Pacific theater.  Most had originally been acquired as combat patrol aircraft, but the limitations noted above quickly relegated them to transport service in the American naval air fleet also. By the end of World War II, the Coronado was outmoded as both a bomber and a transport, and virtually all of them were quickly scrapped by the summer of 1946, being melted down to aluminum ingots and sold as metal scrap, or used as targets for fighter gunnery practice.

Variants

Coronado I
RAF Designation for PB2Y-3
XPB2Y-1
Prototype with four  Pratt & Whitney XR-1830-72 Twin Wasps, engines, one built.
PB2Y-2
Evaluation variant with four  Pratt & Whitney R-1830-78 Twin Wasp engines, modified hull and six  guns, six built.
XPB2Y-3
One PB2Y-2 converted as prototype for PB2Y-3.
PB2Y-3
Production variant with four  Pratt & Whitney R-1830-88 Twin Wasp engines and eight  guns, 210 built.
PB2Y-3B
Lend-lease designation for Royal Air Force aircraft.
PB2Y-3R
PB2Y-3s converted by Rohr Aircraft Corp as freighters with faired-over turrets, side loading hatch, and seating for 44 passengers, 31 built.
XPB2Y-4
One PB2Y-2 re-engined with four  Wright R-2600 Cyclone 14 engines.
XPB2Y-5
The XP2BY-3 converted as PB2Y-5 prototype.
PB2Y-5
PB2Y-3s converted with four  Pratt & Whitney R-1830-92 Twin Wasp engines, increased fuel capacity and provision for RATOG (rocket assisted take-off gear).
PB2Y-5R
PB2Y-5s converted as unarmed transports, some fitted for medical evacuation role.

Operators

 Royal Air Force
 No. 231 Squadron RAF

 United States Navy
 FAW-2
 FAW-3
 FAW-5
 FAW-14
 VPB-1
 VPB-4
 VPB-13
 VPB-15
 VPB-100
 VP-102
 VR-2
 VR-6
 VR-8
 VE-1
 VH-1

Surviving aircraft
 BuNo 7099 – National Naval Aviation Museum, Naval Air Station Pensacola, Pensacola, Florida

Specifications (PB2Y-5)

In popular culture
Victor Bergeron created a PB2Y cocktail for his Tiki bars (Trader Vic's) in honor of World War II airmen.

See also

References

Notes

Bibliography
  
 
 
 Burney, Allan. Flying Boats of World War 2 (The Aeroplane & Flight Magazine Aviation Archive Series). London: Key Publishing Ltd., 2015. .
 Green, William. War Planes of the Second World War, Volume Five: Flying Boats. London: Macdonald & Co. (Publishers) Ltd., 1962 (Fifth impression 1972). .
 Hoffman, Richard Capt. USN (ret.). Consolidated PB2Y Coronado (Naval Fighters 85). Simi Valley, California, USA: Ginter Books, 2009. .
 
 Mondey, David. The Hamlyn Concise Guide to American Aircraft of World War II. London: Hamlyn Publishing Group Ltd., 1982 (republished 1996 by the Chancellor Press, reprinted 2002). .

Further reading

External links

 Consolidated PB2Y Coronado at www.daveswarbirds.com
 1943 article including photos and cutaway drawing of PB27, starting bottom of page 121
 YouTube video of the sole surviving Coronado's restoration being completed and placed on indoor display

PB2Y
Consolidated PB2Y Coronado
Flying boats
Four-engined tractor aircraft
High-wing aircraft
World War II patrol aircraft of the United States
Aircraft first flown in 1937
Four-engined piston aircraft